The Abyssinian longclaw (Macronyx flavicollis) is a species of bird in the family Motacillidae.

It is endemic to Ethiopia.

Habitat
The bird's natural habitats are subtropical or tropical high-altitude grassland of the Ethiopian Highlands, and arable land.

The Abyssinian longclaw is very similar in both appearance and behavior to the yellow-throated longclaw (Macronyx croceus) of other parts of Africa. It is a common grassland bird of the western and south eastern Ethiopian Highlands, except in the extreme north where it does not occur.

Threats
It is threatened by habitat loss.

References

Abyssinian longclaw
Abyssinian longclaw
Abyssinian longclaw
Abyssinian longclaw
Taxonomy articles created by Polbot